The Ridgeway Branch is a  tributary of the Union Branch in Ocean County, New Jersey in the United States.

See also
List of rivers of New Jersey

References

Rivers of Ocean County, New Jersey
Rivers of New Jersey
Tributaries of Barnegat Bay